Curi Cancha Wildlife Refuge is a private wildlife refuge in the central part of Costa Rica, and protects cloud forest in the Cordillera de Tilarán near Juntas. 

The refuge entrance is about a kilometer before the famous Monteverde Cloud Forest Reserve.
The lower portion is drier, with few epiphytes, but the upper portion is cloud forest.
While the forest is not quite so pristine as Monteverde, the most spectacular birds are much easier to see.
The refuge is particularly good for the resplendent quetzal, the most sought-after bird of the cloud forest.  The refuge is also a good place to find keel-billed toucan, Lesson's motmot, orange-bellied trogon, and three-toed sloth, as well as monkeys.

References

External links 

 Curi Cancha Wildlife Refuge at Costa Rica National Parks

Nature reserves in Costa Rica
Geography of Puntarenas Province